Evgeni Ignatov (born June 25, 1959, in Nikolovo, Ruse Province) is a retired long-distance runner from Bulgaria, who represented his native country in the men's 5,000 metres and 10,000 metres at the 1988 Summer Olympics. He also competed at the 1992 Summer Olympics in Barcelona, Spain.

Achievements

References

1959 births
Living people
Bulgarian male long-distance runners
Athletes (track and field) at the 1988 Summer Olympics
Athletes (track and field) at the 1992 Summer Olympics
Olympic athletes of Bulgaria
People from Rousse Province
Goodwill Games medalists in athletics
Competitors at the 1986 Goodwill Games
Friendship Games medalists in athletics
20th-century Bulgarian people
21st-century Bulgarian people